The Buteoninae are a subfamily of birds of prey which consists of medium to large, broad-winged species.

They have large, powerful, hooked beaks for tearing flesh from their prey, strong legs, and powerful talons. They also have extremely keen eyesight to enable them to spot potential prey from a distance.

This subfamily contains the buzzards (buteonine hawks) with great diversity in appearance and form and some appearing eagle-like, with at least 50 species included overall in the subfamily. At one time, several types were grouped, including large assemblages such as booted eagles, but modern studies using mitochondrial DNA clarified that this subfamily was smaller than formerly classified.

Systematics
The subfamily Buteoninae includes about 55 currently recognized species. Unlike many lineages of Accipitridae, which seemed to have radiated out of Africa or South Asia, the Buteoninae clearly originated in the Americas based on fossil records and current species distributions (more than 75% of the extant raptors from this lineage are found in the Americas).

Genera

Extinct Genera
Bermuteo  
Garganoaetus

References

External links
 Accipitridae videos on the Internet Bird Collection

 
Bird subfamilies